The Grand Bahama FA Cup is the top knockout tournament of the Grand Bahama, Bahamas football.

Winners
Winners were: 
1995/96: Pub on the Mall Red Dogs  
1996-99:not known
1999/00:not known
2000/01: Acacom United
2001/02: not known
2002/03: Playtime Tigers
2003/04: Freeport F.C.

References

Football competitions in the Bahamas